The Jibito are an indigenous people of Peru. They first met with the Franciscans monks in 1676 in the forest near the Huallaga River, in what is now Peru's Loreto Province. After their conversion to Catholicism, they settled in villages on the western bank of the river.

References

See also
South American Indigenous people
Hibito–Cholon languages

Ethnic groups in Peru
Indigenous peoples in Peru
Indigenous peoples of the Amazon